Trevor Joseph Goddard (14 October 1962 – 7 June 2003) was an English actor. He was best known for playing Kano in the martial arts film Mortal Kombat, Lieutenant Commander Mic Brumby in the television series JAG and main villain Keefer in the action film Men of War (with Dolph Lundgren and JAG co-star Catherine Bell).

Early life
Goddard was born in Croydon, London, England, in 1962. Between 1974 and 1979, he attended Ravensbourne School, Hayes Lane, Bromley, London. A punk in 1977, he helped form a band at school called The Belsen Horrors (the name of which came from a Sex Pistols track). First a drummer, then the lead singer, he and his band lasted until 1978. Later, sometime between 1979 and 1980, he was the drummer in another Bromley punk band called The Vamp. This group was led by Wayne Cregan, who was one of the first members of X-Ray Spex. Bromley was closely linked with the early punk movement – first through the Bromley Contingent (the first fans of the Sex Pistols), and three famous punk singers who came from this town: Poly Styrene (X-Ray Spex), Siouxsie Sioux (of Siouxsie and the Banshees) and Billy Idol – who like Trevor, attended Ravensbourne School for Boys.

For much of his career, he claimed to be of Australian descent and often played Australian characters.

Career
He appeared in cameo roles in many television shows prior to 1995. That same year, Goddard played Kano in the film adaptation of Mortal Kombat. His performance as Kano became the source of the character's evolution in the video games. However his accent in the film was mistakenly interpreted as Australian, which led to Kano being portrayed as an Australian in future installments. 

He would go on to act in other films such as Gone in Sixty Seconds, Men of War (with Dolph Lundgren and future JAG co-star Catherine Bell) and Hollywood Vampyr. He played a short-tempered mercenary in the 1998 film Deep Rising with Treat Williams and Famke Janssen. Goddard played in the television drama series JAG as Lieutenant Commander Mick Brumby and was featured in TV commercials for the Hoover FloorMate.

He made his last on-screen appearance in the 2003 film Pirates of the Caribbean: The Curse of the Black Pearl.

Death
On 7 June 2003, Goddard was found dead in his home in North Hollywood, Los Angeles, California. He was 40 years old. Initial reports indicated that Goddard was in the process of getting a divorce and that suicide was suspected. An autopsy later showed that Goddard died from an accidental drug overdose of heroin, cocaine, temazepam and vicodin.

Filmography

Film

Television

References

External links

Accidental deaths in California
Cocaine-related deaths in California
Deaths by heroin overdose in California
Drug-related deaths in California
English male boxers
English expatriates in the United States
English male film actors
English male television actors
English people of Australian descent
People from Croydon
1962 births
2003 deaths
People educated at Ravensbourne School, Bromley
Boxers from Greater London